The fourth season of the American reality show Bar Rescue premiered on Paramount Network on October 5, 2014 at 9/8c except for the third half of the season that aired in the 10/9c slot, and concluded on July 31, 2016 with a total of 58 episodes. Like the third season, season four was also split into multiple parts. Season 4 is also the longest season of Bar Rescue to date, having been on the air for nearly two years.

Experts
 Jon Taffer – Host/Star/Bar Consultant/Recon Spy
 Nicole Taffer – Host's Wife/Marketing/Recon Spy

Chefs

Aaron McCargo
Josh Capon
Vic "Vic Vegas" Moea
Nick Liberato
Gavan Murphy
Crystal "Chef Pink" DeLongpré
Jamika Pessoa
Kevin Bludso
Tiffany Derry
Penny Davidi
Ryan Scott
Keith Breedlove
Brendan Collins
Mike Ferraro

Mixologists
Phil Wills
Russell Davis
Kate Gerwin
Mia Mastroianni
Raul Faria
Gerry Graham
Lisamarie Joyce
Kyle Mercado
Jason Bran
Neil Witte
Daniel Ponsky

Other special experts
Jessie Barnes – Hospitality
Renae Lemmens – Entertainment
Jeff Haywood Sr. – Construction Manager

Production
On May 9, 2013, Spike TV renewed Bar Rescue for a fourth season with additional episodes announced by Spike.

Episodes

Notes

References

External links
 
 Bar Rescue Updates — Unaffiliated site that keeps track of bars being open or closed and has updates for each bar

2014 American television seasons
2015 American television seasons
2016 American television seasons
Bar Rescue